Sergio Valle-Ortiz (born January 16, 1988) is an American soccer player.

Career

Los Angeles Blues
After playing for the San Diego Flash of the National Premier Soccer League for the 2012 season Valle-Ortiz signed for the Los Angeles Blues. He then made his debut for the team on 23 March 2013 against Phoenix FC in which he came on in the 81st minute for Chris Cortez as the Blues went on to win 2–0.

Career statistics

Club
Statistics accurate as of 26 March 2013

References

External links 
 Battalion Profile.

1988 births
Living people
American soccer players
Orange County SC players
Association football forwards
USL Championship players
Soccer players from California